Boophis calcaratus (sometimes called the bright-eyed frog) is a species of treefrog found in Madagascar. It has large tubercles on its heels, especially noticeable in females, that distinguish it from most other Boophis species; it is distinguished among the tubercle-bearing Boophis by the lack of webbing on its hands.

References

calcaratus
Endemic amphibians of Madagascar
Amphibians described in 2010